Netball in Tonga is a popular sport, usually played by girls on Saturdays during the winter, though games can be played at all times of the year.

History 
Tonga Netball Association is Tonga's governing body for netball. They are a young organisation having been established in 2012. They joined the International Netball Federation as full-time members in 2011. With the help of Netball Australia and the Australian Government's Pacific Sports Partnership program, netball in Tonga has once again made a comeback.

International competition
In the 1990 Oceania Netball Tournament, Tonga competed along with countries like Australia, New Zealand, Fiji and the Cook Islands.

At Gay Games VI, a transgender netball team from Tonga competed. The 2015 Pacific Games in Papua New Guinea was Tonga's first international netball game since they became affiliates of International Netball Federation.

References

Bibliography

External links 
Oceania Sport